Prespa is a village near Bjelovar, Croatia. It is connected by the D28 highway.

References 

Populated places in Bjelovar-Bilogora County